The Leland Giants, originally the Chicago Union Giants, were a Negro league baseball team that competed independently during the first decade of the 20th century. The team was formed via a merge of the Chicago Unions and the Chicago Columbia Giants in 1901, and then split in 1910 to form the Chicago Giants and what would become known as the Chicago American Giants.  The team was named after its owner and manager, Frank Leland.

History 

In a 1910 article, former shortstop Jimmy Smith described the 1905 season by saying the team "made a great record of 43 straight wins" between May 19 and July 16, 1905, when they were finally beat by the Spalding team on their home grounds in Chicago.

Bruce Petway took over catching duties in 1906 and the talent improved dramatically in 1907 as Rube Foster (HOF), Pete Hill (HOF), "Big Bill" Gatewood, "Mike" Moore and four other players came from East Coast teams. The 1907 team compiled a 110–10 record, including 48 straight wins.

The Giants went 64–21 against semipro teams in 1908 and tied a cross-region match-up with the Philadelphia Giants at three games apiece. The team was managed by Foster in 1909 and was just 8–10 against other top black teams.

The team faced off against the Chicago Cubs in a mid-October series. Johnny Evers and Frank Chance sat out. In game one the Cubs' Three-Finger Brown beat Walter Ball 4–1. The Leland Giants were leading 5–2 in the bottom of the ninth the next day as Foster faced Ed Reulbach, but Rube allowed four runs in that frame to fall on a controversial final play at the plate. In game three, Brown beat Charles Dougherty 1–0. The Leland Giants had lost two one-run decisions and another fairly close game against a team that had won 104 games in the National League, showing they could compete with the top white teams in the country.

In 1910, Foster and Leland split and Foster won the rights to the Leland Giants name; Leland's new team was called the Chicago Giants. The Leland Giants went 11–0 against top black teams that year and said they went 123–6 overall. The club was the most talented to date, as Home Run Johnson and Pop Lloyd (HOF) joined to play the middle infield, Petway, Hill and Foster returned and Frank Wickware joined the staff.

After the season, the team traveled to Cuba for the winter, playing the island's top teams. Cuban teams signed Lloyd, Hill, Johnson and Petway to play with them against the touring Detroit Tigers and Philadelphia Athletics. Black players gained recognition in the Detroit series by outhitting Ty Cobb and Sam Crawford.

In 1911, the club was renamed the Chicago American Giants.

Franchise continuum

References

This article includes information from the article of the same name in the Baseball Reference Bullpen, accessed December 5, 2006. It is available under the GNU Free Documentation License.

External links
Negro League Baseball Players Association
1910 season

Negro league baseball teams
Defunct baseball teams in Chicago
Defunct baseball teams in Illinois
Baseball teams disestablished in 1910
Baseball teams established in 1901
Chicago City League teams